Luke E. Torian (born May 30, 1958) is an American politician. Since 2010 he has served in the Virginia House of Delegates, representing the 52nd district in the Prince William County suburbs of Washington, D.C. He is a member of the Democratic Party.

In 2019, Torian has introduced and passed House bills on a variety of issues, from expediting the screening process for community-based and institutional long-term care services (HB 2474) to extending the benefits of the Virginia Military Survivors and Dependents Education Program to the spouse or child of a veteran with at least a 90 percent permanent, service-related disability (HB 2685).

, Torian serves as Chair of the Appropriations Committee and as a member of the General Laws and Rules Committee. He has previously served on the Agriculture, Chesapeake and Natural Resources Committee and the Counties, Cities and Towns Committee.

Early life and education
Torian was born in Roxboro, North Carolina. He received a B.A. degree in political science from Winston-Salem State University in 1980. Training to become a Baptist minister, he received a master's degree in divinity in 1984 from the School of Theology at Virginia Union University, and a doctorate in ministry from the Howard University School of Divinity in 1987.

Torian worked for the Fellowship of Christian Athletes for eight years. He was pastor of Gilfield Baptist Church in Charles City County, Virginia 1990–1995. Since then, he has been pastor of First Mount Zion Baptist Church in Dumfries.

Community involvement
Torian has been a community leader in Prince William County for decades. He has played a major role in Action in Community Through Service (ACTS), an organization designed to alleviate hunger, homelessness, and domestic violence in the community. He is also one of the founders of Virginians Organized for Interfaith Community Engagement (VOICE), an organization dedicated to making change on social justice issues.

Electoral history 
In February 2009, Republican Party of Virginia chair Jeff Frederick announced that he would not run for reelection to the Virginia House of Delegates. Torian ran for Frederick's 52nd district seat, winning a Democratic primary with more than two-thirds of the votes cast, then defeating Republican nominee Rafael Lopez.

(Note: Write Ins are not included for results after 2011.)

References

External links
 (campaign finance)

1958 births
21st-century American politicians
Baptist ministers from the United States
Baptists from North Carolina
Baptists from Virginia
Howard University alumni
Living people
Democratic Party members of the Virginia House of Delegates
People from Dumfries, Virginia
People from Roxboro, North Carolina
People from Woodbridge, Virginia
Virginia Union University alumni
Winston-Salem State University alumni